Nikta Esfandani (born on May 22, 2005 - died on November 25, 2019, in Tehran) was one of the victims of the Bloody November 2019 in Iran.

Death 
Nikta Esfandani was shot dead on November 25, 2019, in Sattar Khan Street, Tehran. At the same time, Nikta's family expressed their hope on her Instagram page that "the spilled blood of their innocent daughter will not go unanswered. "

The body of Nikta Esfandani was buried in Behesht Zahra, Tehran, on 29 November 2019.

References 

2004 births
2019 deaths
Victims of Iran's November 2019 protests